Mapleton is a census-designated place (CDP) comprising the main village within the town of Mapleton in Aroostook County, Maine, United States. The population of the CDP was 683 at the 2010 census, out of a population of 1,948 for the entire town.

Geography
The Mapleton CDP is located in the southwest part of the town of Mapleton, along Maine State Route 163.

Demographics

References

Census-designated places in Maine
Census-designated places in Aroostook County, Maine